Benter is a German surname that may refer to
Lutz Benter (born 1945), German Olympic rower
Uwe Benter (born 1955), German Olympic rower, brother of Lutz
William "Bill" Benter (born 1957), American gambler

See also
Stratton-on-the-Fosse

German-language surnames